The Upper Galilee (HaGalil Ha'Elyon; , Al Jaleel Al A'alaa) is a geographical-political term in use since the end of the Second Temple period. It originally referred to a mountainous area straddling what today is northern Israel and southern Lebanon. The boundaries of this area were the Litani River in the north, the Mediterranean Sea in the west, the Lower Galilee in the south (from which it is separated by the Beit HaKerem Valley), and the upper Jordan River and the Hula Valley in the east. According to the 1st-century historian Josephus, the bounds of Upper Galilee stretched from Bersabe in the Beit HaKerem Valley to Baca (Peki'in) in the north. The extent of this region is approximately 470 km2.

However, in present-day Israeli usage, the toponym mainly refers only to the northern part of the Galilee that is under Israeli sovereignty. That is, the term today does not include the portion of Southern Lebanon up to the Litani River, or the corresponding stretches of the Israeli Coastal Plain to the west, or the Jordan Rift Valley to the east. These are considered to be separate geographical areas that are not part of “Upper Galilee.”

History

 
Following the dissolution of the Ottoman Empire and the Balfour Declaration in which the British Empire promised to create "A Jewish National Home" in Palestine, the Zionist Movement presented to the Versailles Peace Conference a document calling for including in the British Mandate of Palestine the entire territory up to the Litani river — with a view to this becoming eventually part of a future Jewish state.

However, only less than half this area was actually included in British Mandatory Palestine, the final border being influenced both by diplomatic maneuverings and struggles between Britain and France and by fighting on the ground, especially the March 1920 battle of Tel Hai.

For a considerable time after the border was defined so to make the northern portion of the territory concerned part of the French mandated territory that became Lebanon, many Zionist geographers — and Israeli geographers in the state's early years — continued to speak of "The Upper Galilee" as being "the northern sub-area of the Galilee region of Israel and Lebanon".

Under this definition, "The Upper Galilee" covers an area spreading over 1,500 km2, about 700 in Israel and the rest in Lebanon. This included the highland region of Belad Bechara in Jabal Amel located in South Lebanon, which was at for some time known in Hebrew as "The Lebanese Galilee". As defined in geographical terms, "it is separated from the Lower Galilee by the Beit HaKerem valley; its mountains are taller and valleys are deeper than those in the Lower Galilee; its tallest peak is Har Meron at 1,208 m above sea level. Safed is one of the major cities in this region".

In recent decades, however, this usage has virtually disappeared from the general Israeli discourse, the term "Upper Galilee" being used solely in reference to the part located in Israel.

Gallery

See also
 Galilee Panhandle
 Northern District (Israel)
 Upper Galilee Regional Council

References

External links
 www.galil-elion.org.il
 The Upper Galilee Museum of Prehistory

Regions of Israel
Regions of Lebanon
 
Historical regions in Israel